The Exocoetidae are a family of marine ray-finned fish in the order Beloniformes, known colloquially as flying fish or flying cod. About 64 species are grouped in seven genera. While they cannot fly in the same way a bird does, flying fish can make powerful, self-propelled leaps out of the water where their long wing-like fins enable gliding for considerable distances above the water's surface. The main reason for this behavior is thought to be to escape from underwater predators, which include swordfish, mackerel, tuna, and marlin, among others, though their periods of flight expose them to attack by avian predators such as frigate birds.

Barbados is known as "the land of the flying fish", and the fish is one of the national symbols of the country. The Exocet missile is named after them, as variants are launched from underwater, and take a low trajectory, skimming the surface, before striking their targets.

Etymology 
The term Exocoetidae is both the scientific name and the general name in Latin for a flying fish. The suffix -idae, common for indicating a family, follows the root of the Latin word , a transliteration of the Ancient Greek name . This means literally "sleeping outside", from  "outside" and  "bed", "resting place", verb root κει- "to lie down" (not "untruth"), so named as flying fish were believed to leave the water to sleep ashore, or due to flying fish flying and thus stranding themselves in boats.

Taxonomy
The Exocoetidae is divided into four subfamilies and seven genera:

 Subfamily Exocoetinae Risso, 1827
 Genus Exocoetus Linnaeus, 1758
 Subfamily Fodiatorinae Fowler, 1925
 Genus Fodiator  D.S. Jordan & Meek, 1885
 Subfamily Parexocoetinae Bruun, 1935
 Genus Parexocoetus Bleeker, 1865
 Subfamily Cypsellurinae Hubbs, 1933
 Genus Cheilopogon Lowe, 1841
 Genus Cypselurus Swainson, 1838
 Genus Hirundichthys Breder, 1928
 Genus Prognichthys Breder, 1928

Distribution and description 

Flying fish live in all of the oceans, particularly in tropical and warm subtropical waters. They are commonly found in the epipelagic zone, the top layer of the ocean to a depth of about 200 m (656 ft). 

Numerous morphological features give flying fish the ability to leap above the surface of the ocean. One such feature is fully broadened neural arches, which act as insertion sites for connective tissues and ligaments in a fish's skeleton. Fully broadened neural arches act as more stable and sturdier sites for these connections, creating a strong link between the vertebral column and cranium. This ultimately allows a rigid and sturdy vertebral column (body) that is beneficial in flight. Having a rigid body during glided flight gives the flying fish aerodynamic advantages, increasing its speed and improving its aim. Furthermore, flying fish have developed vertebral columns and ossified caudal complexes. These features provide the majority of strength to the flying fish, allowing them to physically lift their bodies out of water and glide remarkable distances. These additions also reduce the flexibility of the flying fish, allowing them to perform powerful leaps without weakening midair. At the end of a glide, they fold their pectoral fins to re-enter the sea, or drop their tails into the water to push against the water to lift for another glide, possibly changing direction. The curved profile of the "wing" is comparable to the aerodynamic shape of a bird wing. The fish is able to increase its time in the air by flying straight into or at an angle to the direction of updrafts created by a combination of air and ocean currents.

Species of genus Exocoetus have one pair of fins and  streamlined bodies to optimize for speed, while Cypselurus spp. have flattened bodies and two pairs of fins, which maximize their time in the air. From 1900 to the 1930s, flying fish were studied as possible models used to develop airplanes.

The Exocoetidae feed mainly on plankton. Predators include dolphins, tuna, marlin, birds, squid, and porpoises.

Flight measurements 
In May 2008, a Japanese television crew (NHK) filmed a flying fish (dubbed "Icarfish") off the coast of Yakushima Island, Japan. The fish spent 45 seconds in flight. The previous record was 42 seconds.

Flying fish often accidentally land on the decks of smaller vessels.

Fishery and cuisine 

Flying fish are commercially fished in Japan, Vietnam, and China by gillnetting, and in Indonesia and India by dipnetting. Often in Japanese cuisine, the fish is preserved by drying to be used as fish stock for dashi broth. The roe of Cheilopogon agoo, or Japanese flying fish, is used to make some types of sushi, and is known as tobiko. It is also a staple in the diet of the Tao people of Orchid Island, Taiwan. Flying fish is part of the national dish of Barbados, cou-cou and flying fish. The taste is close to that of a sardine. Flying fish roe is known as cau-cau in southern Peru, and is used to make several local dishes.

In the Solomon Islands, the fish are caught while they are flying, using nets held from outrigger canoes. They are attracted to the light of torches. Fishing is done only when no moonlight is available.

Importance

Barbados 
Barbados is known as "the land of the flying fish", and the fish is one of the national symbols of the country. Once abundant, it migrated between the warm, coral-filled Atlantic Ocean surrounding the island of Barbados and the plankton-rich outflows of the Orinoco River in Venezuela.

Just after the completion of the Bridgetown Harbor / Deep Water Harbor in Bridgetown, Barbados had an increase of ship visits, linking the island to the world. The overall health of the coral reefs surrounding Barbados suffered due to ship-based pollution. Additionally, Barbadian overfishing pushed them closer to the Orinoco delta, no longer returning to Barbados in large numbers. Despite the change, flying fish remain a coveted delicacy.

Many aspects of Barbadian culture center around the flying fish; it is depicted on coins, as sculptures in fountains, in artwork, and as part of the official logo of the Barbados Tourism Authority. Additionally, the Barbadian coat of arms features a pelican and dolphinfish on either side of the shield, but the dolphinfish resembles a flying fish. Furthermore, actual artistic renditions and holograms of the flying fish are also present within the Barbadian passport.

Maritime disputes 

Flying fish have also been gaining in popularity in other islands, fueling several maritime disputes. In 2006, the council of the United Nations Convention on the Law of the Sea fixed the maritime boundaries between Barbados and Trinidad and Tobago over the flying fish dispute, which gradually raised tensions between the neighbours. The ruling stated both countries must preserve stocks for the future. Barbadian fishers still follow the flying fish southward.

Prehistoric analogues 
The oldest known fossil of a flying or gliding fish are those of the extinct family Thoracopteridae, dating back to the Middle Triassic, 235–242 million years ago. However, they are not related to modern flying fish, with the wing-like pectoral fins being convergently evolved in both lineages.

See also 
 Flying and gliding animals
 Neuston
 Tradeoffs for locomotion in air and water

References

External links 

 Flying Fish, National Geographic Society

Exocoetidae
Beloniformes
Gliding animals
Fish of Oceania
Marine fish of Africa
Marine fish of Asia
Fish of Hawaii
Fish of Japan
Extant Miocene first appearances
Miocene fish
Quaternary fish
Barbadian cuisine